Louis Grodecki (18 July 1910, Warsaw – 28 March 1982, Paris) was a French art historian. A disciple of Henri Focillon since 1929, shortly after his arrival in France, and naturalized French in 1935, he  met art historian Erwin Panofsky in 1949 at the Institute for Advanced Study in Princeton. Grodecki is famous for his work on romanesque stained glass, of Paris, Picardy and the Nord-Pas de Calais region. His most notable works are about the stained glasses of Chartres Cathedral, in particular a complete catalogue which he never finished. He was a reviewer for the doctoral dissertation of E. Wayne Craven.

Bibliography 

 Au Seuil de l'Art Roman. L'architecture Ottonienne, Paris 1958. Armand Colin 
 Le Maître de saint Eustache de la cathédrale de Chartres et Les problèmes de la peinture gothique et le Maître de saint Chéron de la cathédrale de Chartres, articles republiées dans Le Moen Âge retrouvé, vol. 2, Flammarion, Paris, 1990
 Le Vitrail Gothique du XIIIe siècle, Louis Grodecki et C. Brisac, Office du Livre, Fribourg, 1984
 Le Siècle de l'An Mil (L'Univers des Formes) (French Edition), Gallimard, 1973 
 Ivoires français, etc., Paris, Larousse (1 Jan. 1947) ASIN : B00LI0DRZ6
 Le Vitrail Roman, Grodecki, C. Brisac et C. Lautier, Edition Vilo (1 Jan. 1977) 
 Norway : Paintings from the Stave churches, Preface R. Hauglid. Introduction L. Grodecki. Published by the New York graphic society by arrangement with Unesco,1955.
 Bibliographie Henri Focillon,  Yale University Press, 1963
 Pierrefonds / par Louis Grodecki .Paris: Caisse Nationale des Monuments Historiques et des Sites, 1979. Nouvelle éd 
 Le Moyen Âge retrouvé : De l'an mil à l'an 1200. (Idées et recherches).1986, Paris, Flammarion. 
 Les Vitraux de Notre-Dame de Paris, L. Grodecki, C. Brisac, J. Le Chevallier, Paris 1982, Nouvelles éditions latines. 
 Gothic Stained Glass : 1200-1300 / L. Grodecki and C.Brisac. London: Thames and Hudson, 1985.
 Gothic architecture / L. Grodecki; contributions by Anne Prache and Roland Recht.London : Faber, 1986, c1978.
 Etudes sur les vitraux de Suger à Saint-Denis (XIIe siècle) / Préface d'Anne Prache; ʹEdité par Catherine Grodecki avec la collaboration de Chantal Bouchon et Yolanta Załuska. Paris: Presses de l'Université de Paris-Sorbonne, 1995.

Other Information 
Photographs contributed by Louis Grodecki  to the Conway Library are currently being digitised by the Courtauld Institute of Art, as part of the Courtauld Connects project.

References

1910 births
1982 deaths
French art historians
20th-century French historians
French male non-fiction writers
20th-century French male writers
Polish emigrants to France